Mounties Wanderers FC is a professional soccer club based in Mount Pritchard, New South Wales, Australia. They currently play in the NSW League One (formerly National Premier Leagues NSW 2) competition after being promoted at the conclusion of the 2011 season. They were formed in 1978 as Mount Pritchard Soccer Club, changing their name to Mounties Wanderers for the 2008 season after being sponsored by the Mounties Group. The Mounties group also sponsors the Mount Pritchard Mounties rugby club. The club was originally founded by the Maltese Australian community.

Their current Head of Football is Brian 'Bomber' Brown who was appointed in October 2018.

The club is historically linked with the Maltese-Australian community, and features a Maltese cross on its logo.

References

External links
 OzFootball.net

Soccer clubs in Sydney
Association football clubs established in 1978
1978 establishments in Australia